Dome slatki dome is a Croatian comedy series that started broadcasting on March 18, 2010 on HRT 1. The TV series was produced by Maxima film, and it stars Inge Appelt, Ivica Vidović, Božidar Smiljanić and Luka Juričić.

Cast

External links
 Dome, slatki dome at IMDb
 Dome, slatki dome at MaXima film

References

Croatian television series
Croatian Radiotelevision original programming